Karl Zenger (born 3 June 1873 in Erding; died 19 February 1912 in Haar, Bavaria) was a German figure skater.

Zenger won the title of German Champion in men's figure skating twice, in 1897 and again in 1905. He also won the bronze medal at the European Championship in 1905. He was the older brother of Wilhelm Zenger. Karl Zenger lived around 1900 in Antwerp, Belgium

Competitive highlights in figure skating

References
 Journal “Eis- und Rollsport”, 49th year, No. 9, 5 January 1939

German male single skaters
European Figure Skating Championships medalists

1873 births
1912 deaths